The Not Accepted Anywhere album tour was the touring period from 2005 through to 2007 when Welsh rock-band The Automatic promoted their debut album Not Accepted Anywhere. Over the three-year period, the band covered the United Kingdom several times, as well as touring in the United States, Japan, France and the Netherlands.

The band began touring as an opening act for bands such as Goldie Lookin Chain, Kaiser Chiefs, The Kooks, The Ordinary Boys and Hard Fi in 2005 and early 2006 before appearing third on the bill for the NME 2006 New Music Tour and then going on to perform at festivals such as Reading and Leeds, Oxegen, Camden Crawl, Glastonbury, South by Southwest and Warped tour, amongst others.

On tour the band were supported most notably by friends Viva Machine on almost all UK tours, and by Frank Turner, who had just begun as a solo artist – with The Automatic being fans of his former band Million Dead.

Background

Support shows
In October through to November 2005 the band supported Goldie Lookin Chain on their UK tour, this tour supported the band's release of debut single "Recover ". This tour was followed by an intense period in the studio recording their debut album, heading back out in January to support The Kooks on their Inside In/Inside Out tour.

Later in 2006 the band also supported Kaiser Chiefs at their performances at the Millennium Square in Leeds, and well as supporting The Ordinary Boys in March. Cancelled supporting appearances included Kaiser Chiefs European tour in November 2006, and My Chemical Romance's The Black Parade World Tour in 2007.

During the band's headline of the NME Indie Rock 2007 Tour The Automatic let The View take the headline position at Carling Academy in their native Glasgow.

Design and set-up
From 2006 onwards – when the band were headlining more and more performances, they began using various backdrops – ranging from simple sheet banners, to the more extravagant video screens. The artwork used was all based around designs made by Dean 'D*Face' Stockton for the album Not Accepted Anywhere, and the singles "Raoul", "Recover" and "Monster", many of these were then animated for performances – such as their 2006 London Forum performance where they used three giant screens, incorporating animations with a live feed of the band performing. In 2007 Rock Drops recreated D*Face's Raoul 'Globe' artwork from the re-release of the single – and used throughout tour and festival appearances by the band as a stage banner.

Alex Pennie was often noted by critics for being the band's energetic showman. On the NME 2007 tour Alex Pennie's stage antics lead to a fans classes getting broken, followed by wrestling a member of the audience who started smoking on stage on the Irish leg of the tour. Pennie whilst playing at New York's' Bowery Ballroom in July broke his ankle half way through the set, after one of his jumps went wrong – and sat out several songs until "Gold Digger" when he rejoined his band mates for the remainder of the set.

On several occasions the band's cover of Kanye West's "Gold Digger" would involve other musicians and guests, with primary vocalist and bassist Rob playing flute, Jamie Allen; one of the band's technicians would take over bass guitar, whilst Alex Pennie and James Frost split vocals. At Reading and Leeds festivals in 2006 Goldie Lookin Chain joined the band onstage for the track, whilst Viva Machine joined the band onstage wrapped in bandages in ULU, London in July 2006, and on Warped Tour 2007 Newton Faulkner sung and played guitar on the track. On the closing show of the 2007 NME Indie Rock Tour the band's tour manager Mike Doyle sung vocals on the band's cover of Talking Heads song "Life During Wartime".

Throughout the tour the band requested as part of their rider that venues put together a David Hasselhoff shrine, by October 2006 the band revealed this had been fulfilled by upwards of 20 venues.

Concert broadcasts and coverage

BBC 6 Music's Steve Lamacq covered the band's opening night too their October 2006 leg of the album tour – in Exeter's Lemon Grove. Originally the entire 14 song set was broadcast with 7 songs made available on BBC Online afterwards. The BBC also covered The Automatic at Reading and Leeds Festivals with broadcasts of "Monster" and "Gold Digger" with Goldie Lookin Chain from the Radio 1/NME Tent. A year later at Glastonbury Festival 2007 BBC Three and BBC Online screened much of the band's set.

MTV featured performances of the band at Oxegen 2006, including "Recover" and "Monster", whilst Channel 4 broadcast performances of "Raoul", "Recover" and "Monster" from T4 on the Beach 2006. At South by Southwest in Austin, Texas the band's entire set was filmed by Blaze TV, and later broadcast on Crackle, with "Monster" being made part of the 2007 SXSW DVD.

GMTV Incident and aftermath

On July 21, 2006 the band made an appearance on GMTV – ITV's breakfast program. The band had been told that they would be playing a track on a morning show "not GMTV, it's something on just after it". With a performance the night before at Bristol's Carling Academy, members of the band decided to stay up all night drinking, until the 6:00 am start at GMTV. The band went on live at around 9:00 am, miming their single "Monster" as GMTV were unwilling for the band to perform live. The performance went on to involve guitarist Frost smashing his rented guitar repeatedly onto the floor, before jumping into the drum kit, whilst Pennie walked around with his Alesis Micron keyboard, taking off his trousers and eventually ending up on the floor with Frost, whilst Rob and Iwan continued to mime along to the backing track. During the performance an ITV cameraman received an injury when Frost was destroying his equipment, the cameraman reportedly threatened to sue the band, but later decided not to – saying he was simply pissed off at the time.

A month before the GMTV incident the band also were forced to mime on Channel 4's T4 on the Beach 2006, which they were unhappy about doing – stating prior to playing "Will we go on drunk? Let's just say there will be some interesting dancing going on as we aren't allowed to plug in our instruments."

Personnel

Musicians
 Robin Hawkins – bass guitar, flute, vocals
 Alex Pennie – synthesizer, percussion, vocals
 James Frost – guitar, vocals
 Iwan Griffiths – drums

Additional musicians
 Jamie Allen – bass guitar during "Gold Digger"

Guest musicians
 Goldie Lookin Chain – guest vocals on "Gold Digger" at Reading and Leeds festivals 2006
 Newton Faulkner – guest vocals and guitar on "Gold Digger" on Vans warped tour 2007
 Mike Doyle – guest vocals on "Life During Wartime", NME Indie Rock Tour 2007
 Adequate Seven – guest vocals on "Gold Digger" at the Newquay Boardmasters Festival in 2006
 Capdown – guest vocals on "Gold Digger" at the Newquay Boardmasters Festival in 2006
 Mystery Jets – guest vocals on "Gold Digger" at the Newquay Boardmasters Festival in 2006
 Get Cape, Wear Cape, Fly  – guest vocals and guitar on "Gold Digger" at the Newquay Boardmasters Festival in 2006

Crew
 Stan Saunders – sound
 Jamie Allen – engineer
 Mike Doyle – tour manager
 Darren Lovell – lighting
 Peter Hill – engineer/photography
 James "Jizz" Lawrenson – sound mixer

Reception
During their Not Accepted Anywhere tour the band were noted for their energetic live performances, particularly the antics of keyboardist Alex Pennie, whose performances would involve running around the stage with a Cow bell, strangling himself with a microphone, climbing on-top of amps and speakers

Similarly Robin Monheit of Spin Magazine reviewing the band's New York show in July 2007 wrote "the Bowery Ballroom might not have been packed for last night's Automatic Automatic show, but synth-player/vocalist Alex Pennie performed as if it most definitely was" praising the band's energy. "...Pennie, is a sort of wee-sized caged animal, combining his fidgety keyboard fiddling with the most intense punk roars I've heard since At The Drive-In. Throughout the gig, he will run directly into the crowd, shove any and all fans in his way..." wrote themusicslut.com of the band's performance in New York in March 2007

Critics of the band's live sets were often quick to point out that single "Monster" was best received by audiences at live shows

Set list
With only one album out, the set lists were composed almost entirely of the album's 12 tracks, although on occasion some of the album's b-sides were performed, including "Time = Money" on the October leg of the 2006 tour whilst in mid-2006 the band began covering Kanye West's track "Gold Digger" this was eventually accompanied with a cover of Talking Heads track "Life During Wartime". It wasn't until 2007 that the band began including new songs in their set list, "Steve McQueen" and "Revolution" (later retitled "Secret Police") were first performed on the "ShockWaves NME Indie Rock Tour", originally intended for a new single soon after the tour, but ultimately released on This Is A Fix over a year later.

From Not Accepted Anywhere
 "That's What She Said"
 "Raoul"
 "You Shout"
 "Recover"
 "Monster"
 "Lost at Home"
 "Keep Your Eyes Peeled"
 "Seriously... I Hate You Guys"
 "On The Campaign Trail"
 "Team Drama"
 "By My Side"
 "Rats"

From This Is A Fix
 "Steve McQueen"
 "Revolution"

B-sides
 "Time = Money"
 "Jack Daniels"

Covers
 "Gold Digger" originally by Kanye West
 "Life During Wartime" originally by Talking Heads

Tour dates

References

External links
The Automatic on Facebook
theautomatic.co.uk Official website

2005 concert tours
2006 concert tours
2007 concert tours
The Automatic